The  has its source in the northeastern portion of the city of Seki, Gifu Prefecture, Japan. From there, it flows through Gifu and into the Nagara River. It is part of the Kiso River system.

River communities 
The river passes through or forms the boundary of the following communities:

Gifu Prefecture
Seki, Tomika, Seki, Gifu

References

Rivers of Gifu Prefecture
Rivers of Japan